The German Men's Volleyball Supercup  is a volleyball competition between the champion of Germany and the winner of the Cup of Germany . The first edition of this competition was contested in the 1987–88 season. Since 2022 tournament is played as 8-team tournament Bounce House Cup.

Winners list

Honours by club

References

External links
www.volleyball-verband.de